45 athletes (25 men and 20 women) from Denmark competed at the 1996 Summer Paralympics in Atlanta, United States.

Medallists

See also
Denmark at the Paralympics
Denmark at the 1996 Summer Olympics

References 

Nations at the 1996 Summer Paralympics
1996
Summer Paralympics